State Route 28 (SR 28) in the U.S. state of Virginia is a primary state highway that traverses the counties of Loudoun, Fairfax, Prince William, and Fauquier in the U.S. state of Virginia. The route serves as a major artery in the Northern Virginia region, with it being an important two-lane highway in rural Fauquier and Prince William Counties, the main thoroughfare through Manassas and Manassas Park, and a high-capacity freeway through Fairfax and Loudoun Counties.

Route description 
From SR 28's southern terminus to Nokesville, it is a two-lane rural highway, called Catlett Road through Fauquier County and Nokesville Road in Prince William County where it becomes a 4-lane divided highway up to Manassas. Through downtown Manassas, the route follows one-way streets, with VA 28 westbound following Church Street and eastbound following Center Street and Zebedee Street. From thereon to Centreville in Fairfax County, the road is called Centreville Road. Between Fairfax and Loudoun Counties up to its northern terminus, VA 28 is a six-lane freeway called Sully Road.

Fauquier County

Most of the way through Fauquier County Route 28 runs parallel to Norfolk Southern railroad tracks in order to serve the towns that are placed along them. Several historical markers can be seen along Route 28 as it passes through Fauquier including Supreme Court Justice John Marshall's birthplace and the raid on Catlett Station. For many years the old bridge for Route 28 could be seen just outside Catlett. Historically, the Catlett Fire Department Parade would close Route 28 for several hours each spring, however, this practice was discontinued as traffic became heavier in the 1990s.

Prince William County
Upon entering Prince William County at Nokesville, SR 28 changes its name to Nokesville Road.  At Nokesville, it expands from two to four lanes before reaching SR 215.  Further north, it reaches its first grade-separated interchange at SR 234/Prince William Parkway, south of the City of Manassas.

The next interchange is at Wellington Road in Manassas, mostly to grade-separate the crossing of SR 28 with nearby railroad tracks. This interchange was built as an $18.3 million project and certified under the American Recovery and Reinvestment Act of 2009 on October 5, 2009.  The contract for construction of this interchange was awarded on July 14, 2010.

SR 28 is a main thoroughfare through Manassas, and separates into a one-way pair of Church and Center Streets in front of a Confederate cemetery.  The split routes run through the center of the city and rejoin several blocks later, merging into Centreville Road. The road passes briefly through Manassas Park and then passes through Yorkshire as SR 28 leaves Prince William County where crossing Bull Run into Centreville, Fairfax County.

Fairfax County
VA 28/Centreville Road enters Fairfax County at Centreville, at which point it transitions from an undivided to a divided highway. It starts as a suburban arterial with only at-grade intersections, widening to six lanes at an intersection with Machen Road on the south side of Centreville. In the middle of Centreville, VA 28 transitions into Sully Road and becomes a fully controlled-access freeway, where it crosses U.S. Route 29 at a partial cloverleaf interchange and Interstate 66 at a system interchange with flyovers. Up until 2020, the section of VA 28 between Centreville and Chantilly had signalized intersections at I 66, Braddock Road (SR 620), and Ellanor C. Lawrence Park and was only built to expressway standards. The intersections of since been replaced by overpasses and flyovers as part of the Transform 66 project, which included several improvements to the I 66 corridor through the late 2010s and early 2020s.

After a cloverleaf interchange with Westfields Boulevard (SR 662), Route 28 enters Chantilly. The highway travels through a single-point urban interchange with Willard Road and continues through Chantilly. Route 28 then enters Oak Hill and heads north along the eastern edge of the Washington Dulles International Airport. The next interchanges are for US 50 in Chantilly, the Steven F. Udvar-Hazy Center (an annex of the National Air and Space Museum), McLearen Road, and Frying Pan Road on the south end of Herndon. The road then exits into Loudoun County.

Loudoun County

The first interchange in Loudoun County is at the entrance to Dulles Airport, with access to the airport itself, to the Dulles Toll/Access Road (State Route 267) and Dulles Greenway, and to Innovation Avenue (State Route 209). Continuing north through Loudoun County, Route 28 has interchanges with Old Ox Road and Sterling Boulevard, the former also servicing Herndon. The next interchange is an elaborate interchange with Route 625, Waxpool Road and Church Road, which lead into Ashburn and Sterling, respectively. This interchange features two exits for Waxpool Road from the northbound lanes of Route 28: a left flyover and right loop ramp.

Heading north, Route 28 passes through the industrial and commercial areas of Dulles. It is still known as Sully Road through this stretch, although within Loudoun County it is co-designated as Darrell Green Boulevard, after the former Washington Commanders Hall of Famer (the team's official headquarters is in Ashburn), whose uniform number was 28. A northbound-only, exit-only ramp at Warp Drive is followed by a partial cloverleaf serving Gloucester Parkway and Nokes Boulevard. This interchange leads to both Ashburn and the Dulles Town Center shopping mall. Route 28 ends at VA 7 in Sterling in a complete directional T interchange.

History
SR 28 is one of two routes to survive from the 1918 inception of Virginia's state route system without being completely decommissioned or renumbered, the other being SR 10. However, due to extensions, truncations, and partial renumberings, the current SR 28 contains no portion of the earliest routing, which ran near present-day U.S. 29 from Lovingston in Nelson County to Charlottesville.

Improvement project
In 1987, Virginia authorized the creation of special tax districts. Fairfax and Loudoun Counties quickly formed the first transportation improvement district in the Commonwealth, by imposing a 20 cent per $100 real estate surcharge on commercial and industrial property located near Route 28. The surcharge financed bonds to pay for improvements to Route 28. From 1988 to 1991,  of Route 28 were widened from two lanes to six lanes and interchanges were built at US 50, VA 7 and VA 267.

The completion schedule for each funded interchange and roadway is as follows:

 Air & Space Museum Parkway Interchange – Completed Summer 2004
 SR 625 Interchange – Completed
SR 625 Interchange (Waxpool/Church Roads), Flyover Bridge & Waxpool Road widening – Completed Fall 2005
Church Road Widening and W&OD Trail Bridge – Completed Fall 2006
 SR 606 Interchange (Old Ox Road) – Completed Spring 2005
 SR 662 Interchange (Westfields Boulevard) – Completed Fall 2005
 SR 668 Interchange (McLearen Road) – Completed Spring 2006
 SR 846 Interchange (Sterling Boulevard) – Completed Spring 2007
 SR 607 (Loudoun County Parkway) – Completed Summer 2006
 SR 657 (Centreville Road) – Completed Fall 2007
 Pacific Boulevard (between Sterling Blvd. and Cedar Green Rd.) – Completed Spring 2007
 Willard Road Interchange – Completed Summer 2009
 SR 608 Interchange (Frying Pan Road) – Completed Spring 2010
 SR 209 (Innovation Avenue) – right-in, right-out – Completed Fall 2007
 SR 1793 Interchange (Nokes Boulevard/Dulles Town Center) – Completed Summer 2009
 Warp Drive (formerly Steeplechase Drive), converted from at-grade intersection to northbound exit ramp only – completed fall 2011
 Pacific Boulevard (between Severn Way and Nokes Blvd.) – Fall 2009
 Braddock/Walney Roads Intersection – Completed Spring 2007
 SR 209, full interchange – Construction began Fall 2011, completed early 2017.
 Atlantic Boulevard (extension to Church Road) – Construction began Spring 2010, completed December 2011.
Interstate 66/Braddock Road/Walney Road interchange reconstruction and Poplar Tree Road overpass – construction began April 2018

VA 28 was widened to four lanes southbound between Waxpool Road and Innovation Avenue in January 2017, and northbound between McLearen Road and VA 267 in June 2017. For a decade there have also been proposals to extend Route 28 to north to connect it with Interstate 370 in Gaithersburg, Maryland over a Techway Bridge across the Potomac River. The Loudoun County Board of Supervisors most recently endorsed the bridge at a summer 2017 transportation summit, although Montgomery County, Maryland remains adamantly opposed to the project.

Major intersections

References

External links

The Route 28 Corridor Improvement Project

028
State Route 028
State Route 028
State Route 028
State Route 028
State Route 028
State Route 028
State Route 028